The Armenian Cathedral of Moscow, officially known as Holy Transfiguration Cathedral (Surb paytsarakerputyan yekeghetsi), is the seat of the Diocese of Russia of the Armenian Apostolic Church. Constructed in seven years, it was consecrated in September 2013 by leaders of the Armenian Apostolic and Russian Orthodox churches. It is considered the largest Armenian church and church complex outside Armenia.

History
In the pre-Soviet period, Moscow had three Armenian Apostolic churches—two of which, built in the 18th century, were demolished by the Soviet authorities by the 1930s. The sole church to survive was the small 19th century Holy Resurrection Church at the Moscow Armenian Cemetery (part of the larger Vagankovo Cemetery). Holy Resurrection was returned to the Armenian Church in 1956 and served as the city's sole Armenian church for more than five decades. In post-Soviet period, the Armenian population of Moscow increased significantly, reaching as many as 500,000, while the 2010 Russian census recorded around 170,000 Armenians in the city of Moscow and Moscow Oblast.

The church was conceived in 1996. Moscow authorities allotted land plot for the church complex in the same year. It was initially planned to complete construction by 2001. However, further controversy ensued in 2001 when Archbishop Tigran Kyureghian was accused of embezzling $3 million and was replaced by Catholicos Garegin II with the latter's brother—Yezras Nersisian. Subsequently, the new bishop began to raise funds for its construction.

In October 2004 Catholicos Garegin II and Patriarch Alexy II of Moscow ceremonially set the cornerstone of the church complex. The construction of the church itself began in 2006 and lasted seven years. The construction was extended due to various reasons.

Various individuals contributed to the construction, including wealthy Russian-Armenian businessmen such as Samvel Karapetyan and Ruben Vardanyan. Yezras Nersisian, primate of Russia, stated that an unknown amount of money was spent on the construction of the church because many individuals provided not money, but construction material. However, an estimated $30–35 million is believed to have been spent on construction of the complex.

The consecration ceremony took place on September 17, 2013 and was presided by Catholicos Garegin II. In attendance were Patriarch Kirill of Moscow, President of Armenia Serzh Sargsyan, President of the Nagorno-Karabakh Republic Bako Sahakyan, dozens of Armenian bishops from Armenia and the diaspora, representatives of Russia's Muslim, Buddhist and Jewish communities, and many others.

The first Divine Liturgy took place on September 22, 2013.

In January 2017 pieces from the relics of Gregory the Illuminator, Armenia's patron saint, were presented to the church by Artur Janibekyan, Armenia-born TV producer and manager of Russia's most popular TV channels.

Complex
Besides the cathedral, it includes the chapel of the Holy Cross (Surb Khach), an Armenian school, the headquarters of the diocese of Russia and Nor Nakhijevan, an underground museum and exhibition hall and several monuments, and a parking lot for 200-300 cars.

Architecture
The church complex and the cathedral were designed by Artak Ghulyan, who took over in 2004.

The cathedral was built in traditional Armenian architecture and faced with tuff stone, brought from Anipemza, Armenia—near the medieval Armenian capital of Ani—with over 100 railroad cars. It is thus the tallest Armenian church of the diaspora. The church has a capacity of between 1,000 to 1,200 people. While as many as 2,400 people can fit inside the complex.

The exterior of the cathedral is richly decorated with extensive bas-reliefs of Armenian (Mesrop Mashtots, Saint Sarkis, Gregory the Illuminator, Gregory of Narek, etc.) and non-Armenian (Saint George, etc.) saints and crosses.

Gallery

See also
Armenians in Russia

References
Notes

Citations

Armenian Apostolic cathedrals in Russia
Cathedrals in Moscow
Church buildings with domes

ru:Армянский храмовый комплекс (Москва)